Oenomaus cortica is a species of butterfly of the family Lycaenidae. It is found in wet lowland forest in Panama, Guyana, Peru and Brazil.

References

Butterflies described in 1995
Eumaeini